Vado a riprendermi il gatto (I'm going to take back the cat) is a 1987 Italian romantic comedy-drama film directed by Giuliano Biagetti.

Plot  
Always lived in solitude, working the land (his only company is a cat), one day Alceo meets Ester, a much younger girl than him. The two like each other and Alceo decides to take her to his cottage. Partly for his shady and grumpy character, partly for his deep-rooted habit of living alone, Alceo soon gets tired of his partner. When Ester decides to leave, Alceo would like to compensate her with money: she instead asks him for the cat. Some time later Alceo realizes that loneliness weighs too much on him: he returns to Esther to take her home but, during the journey, to those who ask him where he is going, he answers sardonically to "go and get the cat".

Cast 
 Mario Adorf: Alceo Brancicalori
 Barbara De Rossi: Ester
 Jean-Pierre Cassel 
 Alessandro Partexano

See also    
 List of Italian films of 1987

References

External links

1987 films
1980s romantic comedy-drama films
1980s Italian-language films
Italian romantic comedy-drama films
Films directed by Giuliano Biagetti
1987 comedy films
1987 drama films
1980s Italian films